Charles C. Stelle (25 October 1910 – 11 June 1964) was a United States diplomat.

Early life
Stelle was born to missionary parents in Peking in 1910, and lived in China until he was 14 years old.

Career
During World War II, Stelle worked on the Far East for the Office of Strategic Services (OSS). Stelle was a member of the Dixie Mission (1944–1947), an American observation mission to Yan'an, China, to investigate the Chinese Communists.

References

Dixie Mission participants
1910 births
1964 deaths
American expatriates in China